Bradley Township is one of sixteen townships in Jackson County, Illinois, USA. At the 2010 census, its population was 1,951 and it contained 821 housing units.

Geography

Location grid

Geographical features
Natural
Degognia Creek is the western line of demarcation. Kinkaid and Beaucoup Creeks have their source within its limits, the former flowing southward and the latter in a northeasterly direction. It is further drained and watered by Degognia Creek and some of its eastern tributaries. 
Manmade

History

Bradley Township lies in the extreme north-western part of Jackson County and was named in honor of Judge William Bradley who had migrated to the county with his father Joshua Bradley from Tennessee. The township contained a few settlers before the organization of the State in 1818. It contains two towns, Campbell Hill on the railroad named above,  from its rival, Ava.

This village of Bradley was surveyed and laid out by Edward Newsome, county surveyor, and certified on January 10, 1874. The plat was filed for record with R.W. Hamilton, Circuit Clerk and Recorder, two months later on 19 March. A somewhat prospective but nonetheless partly critical historic description reads "St. Louis & C. R. R. has a station here, and Bradley is deserted, and its glory has paled in the presence of the more youthful competitor."" The source goes on to say that the township had one school building built in 1877, at the considerable cost to the taxpayers of about $1,200, with architectural expertise as well as taste and culture.

In its early days it boasted one hotel kept by Mr. Benson, and its reputation may be inferred from the fact that it was to his hotel the passengers northward or southward on the railroad turned for their dinners. One church was built in the town, erected by the Baptist society, known as "Looney Spring" Church. Judge Bradley and his brother Richard Bradley had both been pastors of this church along with George Gordon. This is the strongest religious organization in that part of the county. Among the members of this church, in its early years, mention is made of David Underwood, his sons and families, the Gordons, the Phoenix, and Downen families. A prosperous Sunday School was connected with the church.

Gordon & Co. were dealers in general merchandise. Augustus Dudenbastle was postmaster and dealer in dry goods and groceries. John Hanna had a drug store, the custom and merchant mill, which was formerly run by Thomas Woods and William Mohlenbrock, "a large and well-conducted establishment, and afford[ed] the farmers a home market for their grain".

Among the substantial farmers of Bradley Township, or as it was then called, Bradley precinct, were Cyrus Bradley, Jonathan McDonald, William Downen, Peter Stuffle and certain Messrs. Phoenix, Tucker, Ward and Underwood. Among the first settlers were Mrs. William Kimmel in 1817 and Mr Barrow. Josiah Cully came to settle in the Bradley settlement in 1836. A very considerable portion of this township consists of land suitable for agricultural purposes, and it is still a heavily agricultural community to this day. In the eastern part, the land is somewhat broken, but of good quality; in the south and west the surface is smooth. Some exceedingly well-tilled farms are found in this section and the traveler through Bradley meets evidence of thrift and plenty on every hand. The people are honest and wide-awake, and are marching abreast of the times. The old log school-houses have largely disappeared, and new frame buildings, comfortably seated and well lighted, are superseding them.

The historic account continues "this was all heavily timbered before 'his echoing axe, the settler swung', and there is yet an abundance of the very best timber. Good qualities of building stone abound."

Cities, towns, villages
 Ava
 Campbell Hill

Unincorporated towns
 West Point at 
(This list is based on USGS data and may include former settlements.)

Extinct towns
 Bradley at 
(These towns are listed as "historical" by the USGS.)

Adjacent townships
 Ora Township (east)
 Levan Township (southeast)
 Kinkaid Township (south)
 Degognia Township (southwest)

Cemeteries
The township contains eleven cemeteries: Barrow, Calvary, Cheatham, Evergreen, Koehn, Kross, Looney Springs, Modglin, Rogers, Saint Lukes and Saint Peters.

Major highways
  Illinois Route 4

Demographics

School districts
 Trico Community Unit School District 176

Political districts
 Illinois' 12th congressional district
 State House District 115
 State Senate District 58

References
 
 United States Census Bureau 2007 TIGER/Line Shapefiles
 United States National Atlas

External links
 City-Data.com
 Illinois State Archives

Townships in Jackson County, Illinois
Townships in Illinois